William John Herrmann (January 11, 1912 – October 6, 2003) was an American gymnast and Olympic medalist. He competed at the 1932 Summer Olympics in Los Angeles, at which he received a bronze medal in tumbling.

References

External links

1912 births
2003 deaths
American male artistic gymnasts
Gymnasts at the 1932 Summer Olympics
Olympic bronze medalists for the United States in gymnastics
Medalists at the 1932 Summer Olympics
20th-century American people